Greater Santo Domingo is a term commonly used referring to the metropolitan area of Santo Domingo in the Dominican Republic.

This may be the Santo Domingo province together with the Distrito Nacional. Before 2001 the Distrito Nacional included the Santo Domingo Province. For administrative and urbanization purpose the Santo Domingo province was split from Distrito Nacional which was made much smaller than before being enclosed by the Santo Domingo province and the Caribbean Sea (south coast).

This metropolitan area also could include several more municipalities.

Greater Santo Domingo:

Santo Domingo province
Santo Domingo Este (East)
Santo Domingo Oeste (West)
Santo Domingo Norte (North)

Distrito Nacional (National District)
Santo Domingo De Guzman
Santo Domingo De Guzman is the capital of the Dominican Republic, enclosed as the only city in the Distrito Nacional. When the law was established, it ripped the Santo Domingo Province out of the Distrito Nacional to enclose the Capital into today's present limits, the term Greater Santo Domingo was created.

Santo Domingo Metropolitan Area

Greater Santo Domingo
Bajos de Haina
San Cristobal

References

External links
 Map of the area by the National Statistical Office (ONE) download in PDF format

Geography of the Dominican Republic